Sunday Mathias (born 1 October 1980) is a Nigerian former weightlifter. He competed in the men's featherweight event at the 2000 Summer Olympics.

References

External links
 

1980 births
Living people
Nigerian male weightlifters
Olympic weightlifters of Nigeria
Weightlifters at the 2000 Summer Olympics
Place of birth missing (living people)
20th-century Nigerian people
21st-century Nigerian people